The Canal de Tancarville is a 25 km waterway in France connecting the English Channel at Le Havre to the Seine at Tancarville. The canal was completed and opened in 1887.

See also
 List of canals in France

References

External links
 Canal de Tancarville guide Places, ports and moorings on the canal. 

Tancarville
Transport in Normandy
Buildings and structures in Seine-Maritime
Canals opened in 1887